The Bass River is a  tributary of the Mullica River in southeastern New Jersey in the United States.

The river is located primarily in Bass River, New Jersey, which was named for the river, which was in turn named for Jeremiah Basse, who served as governor of both West Jersey and East Jersey.

The lower  of the river forms an arm of the estuary of the Mullica. The river is part of the watershed of the Mullica that drains an extensive unspoiled wetlands region of New Jersey.

The Bass River drains 9.2 square kilometers. The majority of the land within the drainage basin is forested, and under state protection. Near the mouth and lower parts of the river, there is tidal influence.

Tributaries
Tommys Branch

East Branch Bass River

West Branch Bass River

Dans Bridge Branch

See also
List of rivers of New Jersey

References

External links

U.S. Geological Survey: NJ stream gaging stations

Bass River Township, New Jersey
Rivers of Burlington County, New Jersey
Tributaries of the Mullica River
Rivers in the Pine Barrens (New Jersey)
Rivers of New Jersey